Tammy Scott-Wallace is a Canadian Progressive Conservative politician who has represented Sussex-Fundy-St. Martins in the Legislative Assembly of New Brunswick since 2020. Prior to running for politics, Scott-Wallace worked as an award-winning journalist for over 25 years, with the majority of those years spent writing for the Kings County Record and the Telegraph-Journal.

Scott-Wallace is a member of the Executive Council of New Brunswick, serving as Minister of Tourism, Heritage and Culture, as well as Minister responsible for Women's Equality. She is the first woman to be elected to represent the riding of Sussex-Fundy-St. Martins.

Early life 
After growing up in Belleisle and graduating from Belleisle Regional High School, Scott-Wallace attended Mount Allison University's political science program before transferring to the journalism program at Holland College. From there, she launched a 25-year career as a journalist, writing for the Kings County Record and Telegraph-Journal for the bulk of her career.

Political career

First election 
Following the retirement of long-time Sussex-Fundy-St. Martins MLA Bruce Northrup, Scott-Wallace secured the Progressive Conservative nomination for the riding in the 2020 New Brunswick general election. Despite the riding being known as a conservative stronghold, the unpopularity of scrapped healthcare reform proposals left the party's standing in the region to be questioned. Assuring voters that the proposed changes would not be re-tabled by her party, Scott-Wallace was able to win Sussex-Fundy-St. Martins with a majority of the vote. In doing so, she became the first woman to represent the riding in the provincial legislature.

Minister of Tourism, Heritage and Culture 
As a freshman in the legislature, Premier Blaine Higgs appointed Scott-Wallace to his cabinet as Minister of Tourism, Heritage and Culture on September 29, 2020. She took over the mandate in the midst of the tourism sector's recovery from the COVID-19 pandemic. Scott-Wallace was also appointed Minister responsible for Women's Equality

Electoral record

Sussex-Fundy-St. Martins

References 

Living people
Progressive Conservative Party of New Brunswick MLAs
Women MLAs in New Brunswick
21st-century Canadian women politicians
Year of birth missing (living people)
Women government ministers of Canada
Mount Allison University alumni